Bethesda Presbyterian Church is a historic church at 502 DeKalb Street in Camden, South Carolina.   A National Historic Landmark, the main church building was built in 1822 and is one of few surviving churches designed by 19th-century American architect Robert Mills.

Description and history
The Bethesda Presbyterian Church is set on the north side of DeKalb Street (United States Route 1) in the center of Camden.  The church campus includes six buildings: the main sanctuary, John Knox Hall, the Bethesda Christian School, Hammet Chapel, the McAm Building, and Westminster Hall.  In front of the sanctuary is a monument, like the sanctuary designed by Robert Mills, dedicated to the memory of the Baron DeKalb, a Continental Army soldier killed in the 1780 Battle of Camden.

The main sanctuary is a rectangular brick building, with a four-columned portico on the south (street-facing) facade and a modest steeple at the north end.  The front facade of the building is laid in Flemish bond, while the other three sides are laid in American bond.  Behind the south portico is a large central round arch niche, which is flanked by symmetrical entrances.  The north facade, which now serves as the main entrance, has a Tuscan portico sheltering a pair of staircases leading up to the gallery level.  A pair of entrances provide access to the main level, and there is a round-arch window opening centered above.  The side walls each have five round-arch windows.  The interior is organized with the pulpit and altar at the south end, with a balcony at the north, supported by unfluted columns.  Decorative elements of the balcony include dentillated elements, recessed panels, and fluted pilasters.

The Presbyterian Church in Camden was established before the American Revolutionary War; its first sanctuary was destroyed during that war, and two more were built c. 1790 and 1806 to satisfy the needs of a grown congregation.  The present sanctuary was designed by Robert Mills, then already an architect of some reputation, and was completed in 1822.  It is stylistically more Classical than some of his later work, and is one of his few surviving ecclesiastical designs.  Although the building underwent a number of alterations, especially in the late 19th century, most of these changes were reversed in the 20th century, and the building bears a significant resemblance to Mills' original design.

The church (along with the accompanying DeKalb monument) was declared a National Historic Landmark in 1985.  It is also a contributing property within the City of Camden Historic District.

See also
List of National Historic Landmarks in South Carolina
National Register of Historic Places listings in Kershaw County, South Carolina
Bethesda Presbyterian Church (McConnells, South Carolina)

References

External links

Bethesda Presbyterian Church web site
Bethesda Presbyterian Church, Kershaw County (502 Dekalb St., Camden), with 11 photos, at South Carolina Department of Archives and History

 Bethesda Presbyterian Church - Camden S.C., Kershaw County at Roots & Recall

National Historic Landmarks in South Carolina
Buildings and structures in Kershaw County, South Carolina
Presbyterian churches in South Carolina
Churches on the National Register of Historic Places in South Carolina
Historic American Buildings Survey in South Carolina
19th-century Presbyterian church buildings in the United States
Churches completed in 1822
Robert Mills buildings
Camden, South Carolina
National Register of Historic Places in Kershaw County, South Carolina
Individually listed contributing properties to historic districts on the National Register in South Carolina
1822 establishments in South Carolina